Ashtonia is a genus of flowering plant belonging to the  family Phyllanthaceae first described as a genus in 1968. It is native to the Malay Peninsula and Borneo. It is dioecious, with male and female flowers on separate plants.

species
 Ashtonia excelsa Airy Shaw - Borneo
 Ashtonia praeterita Airy Shaw - S Thailand, W Malaysia

References

Phyllanthaceae
Phyllanthaceae genera
Flora of Borneo
Flora of Thailand
Flora of Peninsular Malaysia
Dioecious plants